Daniel Solway (born 18 April 1995) is an Australian cricketer who plays for New South Wales.

Solway played Sydney, Australia grade cricket for Bankstown scoring prolifically enough to train with NSW. 
He made his first class debut on 1 November 2019 in the Sheffield Shield clash at Adelaide Oval against South Australia scoring a century.

References

1995 births
Living people
Australian cricketers
New South Wales cricketers